Tham Phannara is a tambon (subdistrict) of Tham Phannara District, in Nakhon Si Thammarat Province, Thailand. In 2017 it had a population of 7,864 people.

History
In 1990, Tham Phannara was one of two subdistricts which were split off from Chawang District to form a new minor district, Tham Phannara. The new district was named after this subdistrict, as the district office was built in it.

Administration

Central administration
The tambon is divided into 10 administrative villages (mubans).

Local administration
The whole area of the subdistrict is covered by the subdistrict administrative organization (SAO) Tham Phannara (องค์การบริหารส่วนตำบลถ้ำพรรณรา).

References

External links
Thaitambon.com on Tham Phannara

Tambon of Nakhon Si Thammarat Province